Robert Arlen White  (born April 9, 1963) is a former American football center in the National Football League for the Dallas Cowboys and New England Patriots. He played college football at the University of Rhode Island.

Early years
White attended Lunenburg High School, where he was a League All-star. He accepted a football scholarship from the University of Rhode Island, where he was a four-year starter. Two seasons at center, one at left tackle and one at right tackle. He was named a team captain and was a part of 2 conference titles in his last two years.

As a senior, the offense featured quarterback Tom Ehrhardt, who led the nation in total offense, passing an average of 50 times a game, while scoring a total of 42 touchdowns.

In 2011, he was inducted into the Rhode Island Athletics Hall of Fame.

Professional career

New York Jets
White was selected by the New York Jets in the seventh round (189th overall) of the 1986 NFL Draft. He was waived on August 25.

Dallas Cowboys
In 1987, he was signed by the Dallas Cowboys and later released on September 7. After the players went on a strike on the third week of the season, those games were canceled (reducing the 16 game season to 15) and the NFL decided that the games would be played with replacement players. White was re-signed to be a part of the Cowboys replacement team, that was given the mock name "Rhinestone Cowboys" by the media. He ended up playing well in those games as the starter at center, and was kept for the rest of the season playing mainly as a backup and on special teams.

In 1988, he suffered a thigh bruise in training camp that forced him to miss 4 contests. He started 3 games in place of an injured Tom Rafferty. The next year, he appeared in 8 games (4 starts).

New England Patriots
On March 23, 1990, he was signed in Plan B free agency by the New England Patriots. He was cut on September 3. He was re-signed on October 26 and released after 2 games on November 6. He was re-signed on November 8 and cut on after one game on November 12.

References

External links
Rhode Island bio

1963 births
Living people
People from Lunenburg, Massachusetts
Players of American football from Massachusetts
American football centers
Rhode Island Rams football players
Dallas Cowboys players
New England Patriots players
National Football League replacement players
Sportspeople from Worcester County, Massachusetts